Khaling is a gewog in Trashigang District, Bhutan.

Etymology
The origin of the name can be found in the blending of "Kha", which means bird in Sharchop, the language of Eastern Bhutan, and "ling", which means 'valley' in Dzongkha, the national language.

Jigme Sherubling Higher Secondary School
Jigme Sherubling Higher Secondary School, popularly known as Jigsher, was established in 1978. The school was formally inaugurated by Her Royal Highness Dechen Wangmo Wangchuk in 1979, with an official name "Jigme Sherubling Central School". It started with 250 students, including 50 girls, and a teaching staff of 15 expatriate teachers. The well-known secondary school initiator of Bhutan, Father  William Mackey, SJ has been instrumental in the foundation of this secondary school.  

The school was upgraded in 1996, incorporating the Class XII arts and commerce streams based on the I.S.C. board.  Now the school also offers a science stream. The school celebrated its Silver Jubilee on 16 May 2003.

References

Populated places in Bhutan